Vinton is an extinct town in Bates County, in the U.S. state of Missouri.

A post office called Vinton was established in 1871, and remained in operation until 1904. The community was named after the local Vinton family.

References

Ghost towns in Missouri
Former populated places in Bates County, Missouri